Pangnirtung Airport  is located at Pangnirtung, Nunavut, Canada, and is operated by the Government of Nunavut.

In December 2005 the Government of Nunavut announced that they would spend $34.6 million to build a new airport.

Airlines and destinations

Gallery

References

External links

Baffin Island
Certified airports in the Qikiqtaaluk Region